Judy Cheeks (born February 13, 1954) is an American singer and actress. In the 1970s and 1980s, she recorded as a soul and R&B singer, before releasing more dance-oriented music in the 1990s. Cheeks performed with Ike & Tina Turner as an Ikette. She also worked as a backing vocalist for various artists such as Stevie Wonder, Donna Summer, Amanda Lear, and David Knopfler.

Life and career

Early life 
Cheeks was born in Miami, Florida on February 13 1954. She is the daughter of gospel singer Rev. Julius Cheeks.

Music career 
Her debut album entitled Judy Cheeks was produced by Ike & Tina Turner and recorded at their Bolic Sound studio in 1973. A tour with Ike & Tina Turner followed and she also performed as an Ikette. Cheeks moved to Germany in 1977 and recorded a duet with Austrian singer Udo Jürgens. Their performance on The Rudi Carrell Show made Cheeks an overnight success in Europe. In 1978 she recorded "Mellow Lovin'" which became an international hit and reached No. 10 on the Hot Dance Club Play chart. Her 1978 album Mellow Lovin' was produced by Anthony Monn (best known for his work with gay icon Amanda Lear) in Giorgio Moroder's Musicland Studios in Munich.

Cheeks wrote for Berry Gordy's publishing form Jobete Music. The Jackson 5 recorded one of her songs "We're Gonna Change Our Style." She did a lot of session work for several major artist while sharpening her song writing skills. Cheeks appears as a backing vocalist for Thelma Houston and Jerry Butler's album Just Thelma & Jerry (1977), Donna Summer's Once upon a Time (1977), Amanda Lear's album Never Trust a Pretty Face (1979), Stevie Wonder's soundtrack album The Woman In Red (1984), and on Boney M.'s album Ten Thousand Lightyears (1984). In 1986, Cheeks provided backing vocals on Alphaville's album Afternoons in Utopia.

Cheeks co-wrote and produced her solo album No Outsiders, released by Polydor in 1987. In the same year, she appeared with Austrian band, Opus, on their self-titled album being co-vocalist on the song, "Givin' a Gift." Cheeks had a career resurgence in the 1990s, when she re-emerged with a string of dance chart hits, including two No. 1s, "Respect" and "As Long As You're Good to Me", released on EMI's imprint Brilliant! in 1995. Her single "Reach" appeared on the Summer Hitmix 94 CD released by ZYX Records in Germany. A solo album, also titled Respect, was released in 1996.

In 2013, Cheeks wrote and co produced her own solo album, True Love is Free. In 2018, she released her single and remixes of "Crying In The Rain"; a song she had written and first recorded by Randy Crawford as "When The Evening Comes". This was followed by the album Danger Zone. In February 2019, Cheeks released a further album of original material, A Deeper Love. In 2020, Cheeks released a new album of original material. "Love Dancin'" the title track was co-written with Stevie Wonder the album also includes a composition by Cheeks longtime friend Betty Wright "Safe In Your Arms." In 2020 she released the single "Within" followed by "Same Pain" in 2021 both in a more acoustic country style.

Other work
Cheeks acted in various movies and TV shows: She starred in her first movie Caribbean Rhapsody (Caribia, 1978) with Rossano Brazzi, filmed in Haiti. 1980 La playa del amor, 1984 SOKO 5113 (TV series, episode: Tapetenwechsel), and starred in one episode of the TV series Salzburger Nockerln in 1992.

Cheeks is the author of Love and Honor about her late father Reverend Julius Cheeks.

Discography

Albums
 1973: Judy Cheeks (United Artists)
 1978: Please Give Me This Night (Ariola)
 1978: Mellow Lovin (Ariola, Salsoul)
1979: Disco Cheeks (Koala)
 1983: Hard on the Heels of Love (Durium)
 1988: No Outsiders (Polydor)
 1996: Respect (EMI, Positiva) – #99 on the UK albums chart
 2013: True Love is Free (Mozan Music)
 2018: Danger Zone (Mozan Music)
 2019: A Deeper Love (Mozan Music)
2020: Love Dancin''' (Mozan Music)

Singles
{| class="wikitable"
|+
!Year
!Single
!Label
!US Hot100
!USR&B
!USDance
!AUS
!BEL
!UK
!Album
|-
|1973
|"Crazy 'Bout You Baby" 
|United Artists
|
|
|
|
|
|
| rowspan="2" |Judy Cheeks|-
|1974
|"Endlessly" 
|United Artists
|
|
|
|
|
|
|-
|1978 
|"Mellow Lovin'"
|Salsoul 
|65
|53
|10
|
|28
|
| rowspan="2" |Mellow Lovin
|-
|1978 
|"The Little Girl in Me"
|Ariola
|
|
|
|
|
|
|-
|1979
|"Don't Wanna Love You Again" 
|Ariola
|
|
|
|
|
|
|
|-
|1980
|"Mercy" 
|Ariola
|
|
|
|
|
|
|
|-
|1983
|"Fascination"
|Dureco
|
|
|
|
|
|
|Hard on the Heels of Love|-
|1987
|"You'll Never Be Alone"
|Polydor 
|
|
|
|
|
|
|
|-
|1988
|"I Still Love You"
|Polydor 
|
|
|
|85
|
|98
|No Outsiders|-
|1993
|"So in Love (The Real Deal)" 
|Positiva
|
|
|25
|
|
|27
|Respect|-
|1994
|"Reach"
|Positiva
|
|
|24
|
|
|17
| rowspan="5" |Respect|-
|1995
|"This Time" / "Respect" 
|Positiva
|
|
|
|
|
|23
|-
|1995
|"Respect"
|Brilliant!
|
|
|1
|
|
|
|-
|1995
|"You're the Story of My Life"/"As Long as You're Good to Me"
|Positiva
|
|
|
|
|
|30
|-
|1995
|"As Long as You're Good to Me"
|Brilliant!
|
|
|1
|
|
|
|-
|1996
|"Reach" (Remix)
|Positiva
|
|
|
|
|
|22
|
|-
|2013
|"Happy"
|Mozan Music
|
|
|
|
|
|
| rowspan="3" |True Love Is Free|-
|2013
|"I Love Praising You"
|Mozan Music
|
|
|
|
|
|
|-
|2013
|"Without Love We're Lost" Remixes 
|Mozan Music
|
|
|
|
|}

 Backing vocal credits 

 1977: Thelma Houston & Jerry Butler – Thelma & Jerry 1977: Donna Summer – Once Upon A Time
 1979: Amanda Lear – Never Trust A Pretty Face
 1979: Patrick Gammon - Don't Touch Me 1984: Peter Hofmann – Peter Hofmann 2 (Ivory Man / Songs & Ballads) 1984: Al Corley – Square Rooms 1984: Boney M. – Ten Thousand Lightyears 1984: Stevie Wonder – "Love Light in Flight"
 1985: David Knopfler – Behind The Lines
 1986: Limahl – Colour All My Days 1986: Kissing The Pink – Certain Things Are Likely
 1986: Alphaville – Afternoons In Utopia
 1989: James Reyne – Hard Reyne 1991: Jackie Quinn – Don't Force The River 1992: Sergio Dalma – Adivina 1993: The Creeps – Seriouslessness''

See also
 List of Billboard number-one dance club songs
 List of artists who reached number one on the U.S. Dance Club Songs chart

References

External links
 Official website
 
 Judy Cheeks on AllMusic
 

1954 births
Living people
American disco musicians
American dance musicians
American house musicians
American women singers
Musicians from Miami
United Artists Records artists
Salsoul Records artists
Ariola Records artists
Dureco artists
Polydor Records artists
EMI Records artists
Positiva Records artists
Ike & Tina Turner members